Chucal Formation is a volcano-sedimentary geological formation in the Andes of Arica y Parinacota Region in northernmost Chile. Sediments of the formation deposited sometime during the Miocene epoch (23 to 5 million years ago) and represent fluvial and lacustrine environments. It overlies Lupica Formation.

References 

Geologic formations of Chile
Miocene Series of South America
Miocene Chile
Geology of Arica y Parinacota Region